Sihlcity is a shopping mall located in Zürich which was built on the ground of a former paper mill near the Sihl river in the Wiedikon district and opened on March 22, 2007.

It comprises some 100,000 sq metres of rental space with a range of facilities, such as restaurants, a shopping center, a multiplex cinema, entertainment, health and fitness/wellness area, nightclub, a Four Points hotel and a chapel.

Transportation 
Zürich Saalsporthalle-Sihlcity railway station is adjacent to Sihlcity and is a stop on line S4 of the Zürich S-Bahn. It is a 5-minute ride on that line from Zürich Hauptbahnhof.

The Zürich tram network also serves Sihlcity with routes 5, 10 and 13.

External links
Sihlcity 

Shopping malls in Switzerland
Tourist attractions in Zürich
Entertainment in Switzerland
Buildings and structures in Zürich